Liashur Sara-ye Olya (also Romanized as Līāshūr Sarā’-ye ‘Olyā; also known as Līāshūr Sarā) is a village in Lat Leyl Rural District, Otaqvar District, Langarud County, Gilan Province, Iran. At the 2006 census, its population was 24, in 8 families.

References 

Populated places in Langarud County